Woolliams is a surname. Notable people with the surname include: 

Anne Woolliams (1926–1999), English artistic director, ballet choreographer, dancer and teacher
Eldon Woolliams (1916–2001), Canadian politician and lawyer
Mickey Woolliams (born 1996), New Zealand rugby player